This is a list of active and extinct volcanoes in Mongolia.

References 

Mongolia
 
Volcanoes